Giancarlo Buono (born October 10, 1969) is an Italian pilot, businessman and university lecturer. He is currently the Regional Director Safety and Flight Operation for the European region at IATA. Previously he has been the youngest Combat Ready Panavia Tornado pilot in the Italian Air Force, and an airline pilot and commander, as well as holding various management posts, at various Airlines, including Lauda Air, Alitalia and Lufthansa Italia.

For his participation as a fighter pilot in the NATO Operation Sharp Guard peace keeping operation in Former Yugoslavia, he has been awarded with the NATO Medal.

He is an expert in Air Transport Safety and a strong advocate of the implementation of a performance based safety oversight system in the EU.

He is the Chair of the EASA Stakeholders Advisory Body, representing the Aviation Industry as an Observer in the EASA Management Board  and represents Civil Air Space Users in the SESAR Joint Undertaking Administrative Board. He is also an Observer to the EUROCONTROL Provisional Council  and a member of the ICAO Europe Air Navigation Planning Group.

He is a visiting lecturer in  "Airline Operational Regulatory Compliance" at City, University of London and in "Safety Management" at the University of Geneva.

Capt. Buono is a Fellow of the Royal Aeronautical Society.

References

Commercial aviators
1969 births
Living people